The 1912 Cincinnati Reds season was a season in American baseball. The team finished fourth in the National League with a record of 75–78, 29 games behind the New York Giants. This was the inaugural year of the Reds' new stadium, Redland Field, later known as Crosley Field.

Offseason 
The Reds moved into a new stadium beginning in the 1912 season, as the club moved from the Palace of the Fans to Redland Field.  The new stadium had a seating capacity of 20,696, which was up from the 12,000 capacity at Palace of the Fans.

Cincinnati replaced their manager Clark Griffith, following a disappointing 1911 season, and replaced him with Hank O'Day.  O'Day, a former pitcher from 1884-1890, had a 73-110 record and a 3.74 ERA in his career.  O'Day was also a former umpire, and notably was behind the plate in the first ever World Series game in 1903.  He was also the home plate umpire who made the initial ruling on Merkle's Boner.  He did not have any previous managerial experience.

The Reds sold shortstop Tom Downey to the Philadelphia Phillies on December 29.  Cincinnati shifted third baseman Eddie Grant to shortstop, where he split playing time with Jimmy Esmond,  as the club named Art Phelan their new third baseman.  Phelan, only 23 years old, saw limited action with Cincinnati in 1910, before spending the 1911 season in the minors.

Regular season 
Cincinnati had a tough season offensively, as the club ranked last in batting average (.256), on base percentage (.323), hits (1310), doubles (183) and home runs (21).  First baseman Dick Hoblitzell hit .294 and had 85 RBI, however, his home run total dropped from eleven in 1911 to only two in 1912.  Outfielder Armando Marsans led the Reds with a .317 batting average, while hitting one home run and 38 RBI in 110 games.  Outfielder Bob Bescher led the National League in stolen bases with 67, and he had a .281 batting average with four home runs and 38 RBI, and scored 120 runs.  Outfielder Mike Mitchell batted .283 with four home runs and 78 RBI in 147 games.

The pitching rotation was led by Rube Benton, as in his first full season as a starting pitcher, he appeared in a National League high 50 games, starting 39 of them.  Benton had a record of 18-20 with a 3.10 ERA while pitching 302 innings, striking out 162 batters and had 22 complete games.  George Suggs led Cincinnati in wins, as he was 19-16 with a 2.94 ERA in 42 games, pitching 303 innings and recording a team high 25 complete games.  Art Fromme finished the year with a 16-18 record in 43 games, throwing 296 innings and 23 complete games, while having a team best 2.74 ERA.

Season Summary 
The club got off to a surprising start of the season, as Cincinnati had a 22-6 record in their first 28 games, leading the National League by 1.5 games over the New York Giants.  The Reds lost 10 of their next 11 games to fall out of first place, and could never recover.  Cincinnati would eventually fall under .500, and finished the season with a 75-78 record, an improvement of five games over 1911, but finished 29 games behind the New York Giants for the pennant.

Season standings

Record vs. opponents

Roster

Player stats

Batting

Starters by position 
Note: Pos = Position; G = Games played; AB = At bats; H = Hits; Avg. = Batting average; HR = Home runs; RBI = Runs batted in

Other batters 
Note: G = Games played; AB = At bats; H = Hits; Avg. = Batting average; HR = Home runs; RBI = Runs batted in

Pitching

Starting pitchers 
Note: G = Games pitched; IP = Innings pitched; W = Wins; L = Losses; ERA = Earned run average; SO = Strikeouts

Other pitchers 
Note: G = Games pitched; IP = Innings pitched; W = Wins; L = Losses; ERA = Earned run average; SO = Strikeouts

Relief pitchers 
Note: G = Games pitched; W = Wins; L = Losses; SV = Saves; ERA = Earned run average; SO = Strikeouts

External links
1912 Cincinnati Reds season at Baseball Reference

Cincinnati Reds seasons
Cincinnati Reds season
Cincinnati Reds